The 2008 CAF Champions League was the 44th edition of the CAF Champions League, the Africa's premier club football tournament prize organized by the Confederation of African Football (CAF). Al Ahly of Egypt defeated Coton Sport of Cameroon in the final to win their sixth title.

Qualifying rounds

Preliminary round
The preliminary round first legs were played on 15–17 February, and the second legs were played on 29 February-2 March 2008.4

|}
Byes: ASEC Mimosas, Etoile du Sahel, JS Kabylie, Al Ittihad, Al Ahly, and Al Hilal.

1 Invincible Eleven withdrew. 
2 CAF ordered that the tie was to be played over one leg in Kinshasa due to the civil war in Chad, but Renaissance FC objected to the ruling and refused to travel; they were ejected from the competition, fined $4000 and banned from CAF competitions for three years. 
3 Tusker FC were ejected from the competition and fined $5000 after Kenyan immigration officials refused the appointed match officials for the first leg entry into the country. 
4 Wallidan FC and FC Civics withdrew before the draw.

Note: Clubs from the Central African Republic, Djibouti, Kenya, Liberia, Malawi, São Tomé and Príncipe, Sierra Leone and Somalia all had their entries rejected for failure to fulfil their financial obligations.

First round
The 1/16 Finals first leg matches were played on 21–23 March and the second legs were played on 4–6 April 2008.

|}
1Al Tahrir withdrew due to internal dissent.

Second round
The 1/8 Finals first legs were played on 25–27 April and the second legs were played on 9–11 May 2008.

|}

Group stage

Group A

Group B

Knockout stage

Bracket

Semifinals
The first legs were played on 5 October and the second legs on 17–19 October.

|}

Final

Top goalscorers 
The top scorers from the 2008 CAF Champions League are as follows:

See also
2008 FIFA Club World Cup

References

External links
"African Club Competitions 2008" at RSSSF

 
CAF Champions League seasons
1